Hoseynabad (also Romanized as Ḩoseynābād; also known as Hoseyabad) is a village in Qarah Chaman Rural District, Arzhan District, Shiraz County, Fars Province, Iran. At the 2006 census, its population was 594, in 122 families.

References 

Populated places in Shiraz County